Philemon und Baucis, oder Jupiters Reise auf die Erde (Philemon and Baucis, or Jupiter's Journey to Earth), Hob. XXIXb:2, is an opera in one act by Austrian composer Joseph Haydn to a  German libretto, possibly by Prince Esterházy's librarian, Phillip Georg Bader. The text is based upon a play by G. K. Pfeffel, itself a retelling of the Baucis and Philemon myth from Ovid's Metamorphoses. The work is in the form of a Singspiel.

Composition history

Premiering in 1773 for a visit from Empress Maria Theresa, Philemon und Baucis is Haydn's first puppet-opera, and the first known to be written for the Eszterháza Marionettentheater (puppet theater). Its premiere was complemented by a Vorspiel, Der Götterrat (The Council of the Gods), and possibly Haydn's Symphony No. 50, Hob. I:50. Philemon und Baucis was revised to be a traditional opera in 1776.

In 1950, an original manuscript was uncovered at the Paris Conservatoire by musicologist and Haydn scholar Jens Peter Larsen. Until this discovery, all that remained of the work was its overture and a single aria. Apart from the score for the main story, the manuscript included the entrance of Diana and additional music by Haydn (including an aria from Il mondo della luna), Carlo d'Ordoñez, and Gluck. The rest of the puppet-opera, including the arrival of Jupiter, the pageant, and the epilogue, which glorified the Empress and the Habsburgs, remain lost, likely destroyed in the Eszterháza fire of 1779.

Roles

The opera is scored for 2 oboes, bassoon, 2 horns, 2 clarini (natural trumpets), timpani, 2 violins, viola, and continuo.

Synopsis

Part I
Setting: A village in ancient Phrygia
Philemon and Baucis, husband and wife, assist their son Aret and his fiancé Narcissa in preparing for their wedding. As narrator, Mercury furtively watches the family and the other peasants of the village as their behavior grows more and more raucous and depraved. The other gods entreat Jupiter to stop the madness. At the top of Mount Olympus, the gods agree to send a storm upon Phrygia as punishment. The oncoming storm surprises the peasants, and Aret and Narcissa are killed by a bolt of lightning. At first, Philemon and Baucis beg the gods for mercy, but eventually resolve to accept the divine judgment. The storm dissipates.

Part II
After being rejected from all other homes in the village, Jupiter and Mercury arrive at the doorstep of Philemon and Baucis, dressed incognito as vagabonds. The old couple invites the gods inside their hut, still lamenting the passing of Aret and Narcissa, whose ashes are preserved in urns. Touched by the couple's hospitality and grief, Jupiter and Mercury reveal their true identities and reanimate the bodies of Aret and Narcissa from the ashes. Filled with gratitude, Philemon and Baucis plead with Jupiter to turn their hut into a temple so that they may serve his honor as priest and priestess. Jupiter agrees, and everyone sings his praises. The gods rebuke the earlier unwelcoming peasants before ascending to heaven.

Recordings
 1953: Meinhard von Zallinger (cond.); Vienna Symphony Orchestra; Erich Majkut (Philemon), Susana Naidic (Baucis), Waldemar Kmentt (Aret), Elisabeth Roon (Narcissa); choir of the Vienna State Opera. LP, Vox PL 7660
 2009 (rec. 2002):  (cond.); ; Manuel Warwitz (Philemon), Nathalie Vinzent (Baucis), Bernhard Berchtold (Aret),  (Narcissa); Kammerchor Salzburg. CD, Profil PH 09038
 2009 (rec. 2008):  (cond.); ; Christoph Genz (Philemon), Maren Engelhardt (Baucis),  (Aret),  (Narcissa); Vocalforum Graz. BIS-SACD-1813

References

External links
Kiss Tividar (Aret) and Gabi Gál (Narcissa): 

Operas
German-language operas
Singspiele
1773 operas
Operas by Joseph Haydn
Operas based on plays
Operas based on Metamorphoses
Operas set in Greece